Soldiers. Story from Ferentari (original title in Romanian: Soldații. Poveste din Ferentari) is a 2017 Romanian drama film directed by Ivana Mladenović and based on the novel with the same title by Adrian Schiop.

Storyline
The film tells the story of Adi (Schiop), an introverted anthropologist who moves into Ferentari, an ill-famed neighbourhood of Bucharest, to study for his PhD in manele music. After meeting Alberto (Vasile Pavel-Digudai), a Romani former convict who was sexually abused in prison, they begin a romantic relationship.

Awards
For Soldiers. Story from Ferentari, Mladenović won Best Debut at the 2018 Gopo Awards; the film also received nominations for Best Actor (Vasile-Digudai) and Best Art Direction (Adrian Cristea).

Cast

Adrian Schiop as Adi
Vasile Pavel as Alberto
Ștefan Iancu as Andrei
Nicolae Marin as Borcan
Dan Bursuc as the Manager
Kana Hashimoto as Brigitte
Sorin Cocis as the Policeman

References

External links 
 

2017 films
2017 drama films
Romanian drama films
2010s Romanian-language films
Films set in Bucharest
Films about Romani people
Gay-related films
Films based on Romanian novels
LGBT Romani culture
Romanian LGBT-related films
2017 LGBT-related films